The Queen's Crown tournament is a women's professional wrestling single-elimination tournament held by WWE, a Connecticut-based professional wrestling promotion. Established in 2021, the prize for winning the tournament is earning the moniker of "Queen". It is considered the female version of WWE's long-standing King of the Ring tournament for male wrestlers.

Like the King of the Ring tournament, female wrestlers from the Raw and SmackDown brand divisions participate. The inaugural tournament, consisting of eight female wrestlers, began on the October 8, 2021, episode of SmackDown. Taking place across episodes of Raw and SmackDown, the tournament culminated at the Crown Jewel pay-per-view (PPV) and livestreaming event, where SmackDown's Zelina Vega defeated Raw's Doudrop to become the inaugural Queen.

The tournament is scheduled to return in 2023 and culminate at the King and Queen of the Ring PPV and livestreaming event in May 2023.

History 
In 1985, the American professional wrestling promotion WWE, at that time known as the World Wrestling Federation (WWF), established the King of the Ring tournament as a men's single-elimination tournament, the winner of which is crowned the "King of the Ring". In 2016, the "Women's Evolution" began in WWE, where the promotion began to treat their female wrestlers on an equal level as the men. In the years following this, WWE introduced female versions of matches that were originally only contested by male wrestlers—such as the Royal Rumble match and Money in the Bank ladder match. In October 2021, WWE established a female counterpart to the King of the Ring tournament, called the Queen's Crown tournament, held between wrestlers from the Raw and SmackDown brand divisions. The inaugural tournament was announced to be held simultaneously with the 2021 King of the Ring tournament and culminate at the Crown Jewel pay-per-view (PPV) and livestreaming event.

Along with the King of the Ring tournament, Queen's Crown is scheduled to return in 2023 and culminate at a dedicated PPV and livestreaming event called King and Queen of the Ring on May 27, 2023.

Queen gimmick
Similar to the King of the Ring tournament, the prize for winning the Queen's Crown tournament is earning the title of "Queen", though unlike the King of the Ring tournament, the winner is simply called "Queen" instead of "Queen of the Ring". As several King of the Ring winners have taken on a king's gimmick with varying degrees of indulgence, inaugural Queen's Crown winner Zelina Vega adopted a queen's gimmick and began to refer to herself as Queen Zelina. She began wearing a crown, a cape, and carrying a scepter, while speaking and acting in a regal manner, though acting more like a tyrannical queen due to Vega portraying a heel. After taking a brief hiatus in mid-2022, Vega returned in October and dropped the queen gimmick.

2021 tournament 

The 2021 Queen's Crown was the inaugural edition of the Queen's Crown tournament. Consisting of eight female wrestlers, four each from the Raw and SmackDown brands, the tournament was divided into two brackets, one for each brand, and the winners of each bracket faced each other in the final. The inaugural tournament began on the October 8 episode of SmackDown and continued to be held across episodes of Raw and SmackDown. It concluded at the Crown Jewel pay-per-view and livestreaming event on October 21, 2021. In the final, SmackDown's Zelina Vega defeated Raw's Doudrop to become the inaugural winner.

Bracket

2023 tournament 

The 2023 Queen's Crown is the upcoming second edition of the Queen's Crown tournament. While it is unknown when the tournament will start, it will conclude at the King and Queen of the Ring pay-per-view and livestreaming event on May 27, 2023.

Reception 
The Queen's Crown tournament was heavily criticized by fans for not being on equal ground with the men's King of the Ring tournament. The length of the tournament's first six matches were a combined 13 minutes and 40 seconds, equaling an average of roughly two minutes and 15 seconds per match. This is in stark contrast to the first six matches of the King of the Ring tournament, where none were shorter than eight minutes.

References

2021 in professional wrestling
October 2021 events in the United States
Women in WWE
Women's professional wrestling tournaments
WWE Network events
WWE tournaments